Andrey Marcos Andrade Pereira (born 28 November 1998), commonly known as Andrey, is a Brazilian footballer who currently plays as a midfielder for Los Cabos United.

Career statistics

Club

Notes

References

1998 births
Living people
Brazilian footballers
Brazilian expatriate footballers
Association football midfielders
Ascenso MX players
Brazilian expatriate sportspeople in Mexico
Expatriate footballers in Mexico
Elosport Capão Bonito players
Leones Negros UdeG footballers